Cleverlance Enterprise Solutions a.s. is an information technologies company with HQ in The Czech Republic and branch offices in Prague, Brno, Bratislava and Bremen. Cleverlance develops its own products, integrates IT platforms and provides analytical services as well as testing of software. These services are offered by Cleverlance to clients ranging from financial institutions, through telecommunications to the power or automotive industries. Since the 30th of October 2017, Cleverlance became a member of the Association of Virtual and Augmented Reality and is currently working on several applications of VR and AR.

History

Origins 
Cleverlance was founded in 1999, in Czechia, as a company which specialized in developing for the Java EE platform. The founding members were Jakub Dosoudil, Jan Šeda a Dobromil Podpěra. Jan Šeda later sold his share in the company to the other founders. In 2004, Cleverlance Group was founded.

Death of Dosoudil 
During the 2004 Christmas holidays, one of the founding members of Cleverlance, Jakub Dosoudil (27 years old at the time), went to Thailand with his girlfriend Michaela Beránková (25 years old at the time, also working for Cleverlance). They died in the Indian Ocean tsunami, which killed almost 230 000 people. The rest of the employees and owners of Cleverlance were trying to find the couple, along with their families, after Dosoudil and Beránková have been reported missing. Their bodies were found and identified in 2005. The deaths of Dosoudil and Beránková were a huge loss for the company and created a very chaotic situation for the company overall.

Later development 
In 2017, the annual revenue of the company crossed 1 billion Czech crowns. In 2019 the new majority owner became the KKCG group.

Invinit Group 
Invinit Group (formerly known as Cleverlance Group) is a family of different IT companies, connected to the founding firm Cleverlance and dealing with many different aspects of information technologies. Apart from 
Cleverlance Enterprise Solutions, the companies include:

AEC 
AEC is a Czech IT company, which was created in 1991 and deals with various facets of cyber security. AEC became a member of Cleverlance Group in 2007, through an acquisition agreement between the companies.

Eicero 
Eicero became a member of Cleverlance Group in 2010. The company deals in the complex diagnostics of photovoltaic power stations and the elimination of PID (Potential-induced degradation), which causes lowering of output of a given power station. The main product of Eicero is PID Doctor, a device regenerates photovoltaic panels that were damaged by PID and restores their performance.

TrustPort 
TrustPort is a provider and developer of computer safety solutions. TrustPort products are based on antivirus and encryption technologies, anti-spam methods and anomaly behavior monitoring AI techniques. TrustPort became member of the group in March 2008. The company was created as an independent subject within Cleverlance Group after the acquisition of AEC, from which TrustPort became independent.

IT education 
Cleverlance periodically holds so called Academies, in which members of the public can learn about specific IT topics and be granted a certificate after going through this intense crash course. After the course is completed, the best scoring people are offered a job position in Cleverlance. Most often held Academy is the Testing Clever Academy, designed to teach attendees the ins and outs of IT testing within a single week and Testing Java Academy, focused on developers early in their career. Cleverlance also organizes education academies for the .NET and database technologies.

Name of the company 
The name is a combination the words „clever“ and „lance“, which both have connotations of sharpness. The name was thought up by the founding member Jakub Dosoudil, while on vacation in Mexico.

References

Information technology companies of the Czech Republic